Tridysderina is a genus of Ecuadorian goblin spiders that was first described by Norman I. Platnick, L. Berniker & A. B. Bonaldo in 2013.

Species
 it contains six species, found only in Ecuador:
Tridysderina archidona Platnick, Berniker & Bonaldo, 2013 – Ecuador
Tridysderina bellavista Platnick, Berniker & Bonaldo, 2013 – Ecuador
Tridysderina galeras Platnick, Berniker & Bonaldo, 2013 – Ecuador
Tridysderina jatun Platnick, Berniker & Bonaldo, 2013 – Ecuador
Tridysderina tena Platnick, Berniker & Bonaldo, 2013 – Ecuador
Tridysderina yasuni Platnick, Berniker & Bonaldo, 2013 (type) – Ecuador

See also
 List of Oonopidae species

References

Araneomorphae genera
Oonopidae
Spiders of South America